Hyndman Peak, at an elevation of  above sea level, is the ninth highest peak in Idaho and the highest point in the Pioneer Mountains, Sawtooth National Forest, and Blaine County.  Hyndman Peak is located on the border of Custer and Blaine counties.  The towns of Hailey, Ketchum, and Sun Valley are west of the peak.

The mountain was named after Major William Hyndman, an early settler, and businessperson in the local mining industry. The first recorded ascent of Hyndman Peak was made in 1889 by W. T. Griswold and E. T. Perkins.  The primary route to the summit is class 2, which along with its proximity to Sun Valley makes it a popular destination.

The trailhead to hike to Hyndman Peak is located at the end of Sawtooth National Forest road 203 along Hyndman Creek.  The primary route is approximately  one way from the trailhead and traverses through Hyndman Basin, which is bordered by Hyndman, Old Hyndman, and Cobb Peaks.  The route follows an unmaintained trail and ascends the Hyndman-Old Hyndman saddle before reaching the summit.

References

External links 

 
 Hyndman Peak trip report
 SummitPost.org - HyndmanPeak
 Sawtooth National Forest - Official Site
 Idaho Summits - Hyndman Peak
 Idaho 12ers

Mountains of Idaho
Mountains of Blaine County, Idaho
Mountains of Custer County, Idaho
Sawtooth National Forest
Articles containing video clips